The Buttevant Rail Disaster was a train crash that occurred on 1 August 1980 at Buttevant Railway Station, County Cork, in Ireland,  from Dublin on the main line to Cork. More than 70 people were injured, and 18 died, in one of Ireland's worst rail disasters.

The accident
At 12:45pm the 10:00am Dublin (Heuston) to Cork (Kent) express train entered Buttevant station carrying 230 bank holiday passengers. The train was diverted off the main line across a 1:8 temporary set of points into a siding. The locomotive remained upright but the carriages immediately behind the engine and generator van jack-knifed and were thrown across four sets of rail lines. Two coaches and the dining car were totally demolished by the impact. This resulted in the deaths of 18 people and over 70 people being injured.

The accident happened because a set of manual facing points were set to direct the train into the siding. These points had been installed about four months previously and were not connected to the signal cabin. The permanent way maintenance staff were expecting a stationary locomotive at the Up platform to move into the siding and had set the points for the diversion to the siding without obtaining permission from the signalman. Upon seeing that this had been done, the signalman at Buttevant manually set the signals to the Danger aspect and informed the pointsman to reset the points. 

The train was travelling too fast to stop in time.

Local doctor Finnbarr Kennedy was nearby at the time of the crash, waiting to cross the line, and was able to give aid to those injured.

The train
The train consisted of 071 Class locomotive number 075, a generator van and 11 coaches. Six of the coaches had wooden bodies on steel underframes. Four of these were either destroyed or badly damaged, the two which survived being at the rear of the train. The remainder of the coaches were light-alloy  Cravens stock; most of which survived the crash. The generator van, a modified BR Mark 1, was severely damaged. All of the vehicles were coupled using screw shackle couplings.

Locomotive 075 (1976), front plates damaged
Generator/boiler & guards van, No. 3191 (1971), severely damaged
Open 1st class, / timber body No. 1145 (1963), body destroyed
Buffet car / timber body No. 2408 (1953), body destroyed
Self-service car / timber body No. 2412 (1954), body destroyed
Standard carriage / plywood body No. 1491 (1961), badly damaged
Standard craven / light alloy frame No. 1529 (1964), badly damaged
Standard craven / light alloy frame No. 1527 (1964), body damaged
Standard craven / light alloy frame No. 1508 (1964), both ends damaged
Standard craven / light alloy frame No. 1542 (1965), one end damaged
Standard craven / light alloy frame No. 1541 (1965), no damage
Open standard / timber body No. 1365 (1953), no damage
Standard class and brake van / timber body No. 1936 (1959), no damage

Aftermath
This event, and the subsequent Cherryville junction accident, which killed a further seven people, accounted for 70% of all Irish rail deaths over a 28-year period. CIÉ and the Government came under severe public pressure to improve safety and to modernise the fleet. A major review of the national rail safety policy was held and resulted in the rapid elimination of the wooden-bodied coaches that had formed part of the train.

The passengers who were most severely injured or killed were seated in coaches with wooden frames. This structure was incapable of withstanding a high-speed crash and did not come near to the safety standards provided by modern (post-1950s) metal-body coaches. The expert bodies that reviewed the accident discovered that the old timber-frame carriage bodies mounted on a steel frame were totally inadequate as they were prone to complete collapse (the "accordion" effect) under the enormous compression forces of a high-speed collision. While the steel underbody remained structurally intact, other carriages could "mount" the frame, completely compress and destroy the wooden frame body.

The more modern steel-framed carriage bodies remained intact due to their greater structural rigidity.  On this basis, the decision was quickly made to purchase a new fleet of modern intercity coaches based on the British Rail Mark 3 design. The Mark 3's longitudinally corrugated roof can survive compression forces of over 300 tonnes. These coaches, of an already well-proven design, were built by BREL in Derby, England and, under licence, at CIÉ's own workshops at Inchicore in Dublin between 1983 and 1989.

Commemoration
On 8 August 2005, a commemoration marking the 25th anniversary of the accident was held at the station. A bronze sculpture in the shape of two crossing train tracks was unveiled alongside a plaque commemorating the names of the victims.

List of names of people who died in the Buttevant train crash:

1. Eileen Redmond, aged 66, Leinster Terrace Wexford

2. Patrick Larkin, aged 77, of 18 Parkview West, Templemore, Co Tipperary

3. Sr. De Lourdes O’ Brien, aged 68, of Convent of Jesus and Mary Gortnor Abbey, Crossmolina, Co. Mayo

4. Sr. Mary Stanislaus Kelleher, aged 63, of Convent of Jesus and Mary Gortnor Abbey, Crossmolina, Co. Mayo

5. Bruce Woodworth, aged 36, of Carrighoun, Old Court, Rochestown, Cork

6. Seamus Coffey, aged 27, of Monalea Estate, Tallaght, Co. Dublin

7. Timothy McCarthy, aged 56, of Hansboror Road, Wellington Road, Cork, who was the train guard.

8. Sr. Margaret Mary O’ Donoghue, aged 68, of Sister of Providence in the Rosinian Convent, Leicester, England

9. Margaret Devlin, aged 29, of St. Josephe’s Villas, Athlone, Co. Westmeath

10. John O’Connor, aged 50, of Greenfield Avoca Avenue, Blackrock, Co. Dublin

11. Mark Barron, aged 18, of Palmerstown Avenue, Palmerstown, Co. Dublin

12. Patrick Alan George, aged 25, of 22 Rue Docteur Mazel, Grenoble, France.

A native of Middlesex, he had been attached to the staff of the Institute Lauclangeview, Grenoble, for three years

13. Albin Zainer, age 50s, of 1050 Brandmayergasse, Vienna

14. Maria Anna Zainer, wife of Albin Zainer, age 50s, of 1050 Brandmayergasse, Vienna

15. Gertrude Bertha Unterberger, aged 71, of Box 690, R.D., 4 East Stroudsburg, Pennsylvania, USA

16. Virgil John Livingston, aged 70, of 13030 Mitchwin Road, Mitchwin Road, Dallas, Texas, USA

17. Samuel Samuel Owen Corke, aged 60, of 81 Warick Place, Priors park, Tewkesbury, Gloucestershire, England

18. Winifred Meaher, of Templemore, Co. Tipperary, was originally listed as critically injured and became the 18th fatality of the crash.

References

External links
 Buttevant Disaster Official Report
 Eyewitness comment of railway worker on the day

Derailments in the Republic of Ireland
Railway accidents in 1980
1980 in Ireland
Transport in County Cork
History of County Cork
August 1980 events in Europe
1980 disasters in Ireland